In taxonomy, Jannaschia is a genus of the Rhodobacteraceae.

Name
The genus is named for Holger W. Jannasch, a German microbiologist described as "one of the pioneers of marine microbiology".

References

Further reading

Scientific journals

Scientific books

Scientific databases

External links

Rhodobacteraceae
Bacteria genera